P. K. Pokker (born 1 June 1954) is an Indian academic, who works as the Professor of Philosophy in Calicut University. He is the former director of State Institute of Languages, Keralabhasha Institute. Then, from 1st July 2015 to July 2017 he became Senior Fellow of Indian Council of Philosophical Research (ICPR)New Delhi, and Visiting Professor Vaikom Muhammed Basheer Chair,  Calicut University from 2018 to 2021 February. Now he is Dean of Social Sciences ,Thunjathezhuthachan Malayalam University, Tirur, Kerala.  The first book, Aadhunikotharathayude Keraleeya Parisaram (Postmodernism in the context of Kerala) published in 1996 got wider attention in Kerala and won Thayat award for literary criticism in 1997. In 2007 he got Kerala Sahithya academy award for scholarly literature.  In the first book an attempt was made to reveal the role of  new theoretical approaches especially in understanding the cultural scenario of the world after cold-war. He has attended many national and international seminars. In academics he produced a number of PhDs and M.Phil scholars. There are about forty research articles and a good number of News paper- News weekly articles at his credit.

List of works 
Some of Pokker's works include:

 Books in Malayalam
 Aadhunikotharathayude Keraleeya Parisaram (Postmodernism in Kerala context)
 Keraleeyathayude Varthamam
 Derrida, Apanirmanathinte Darshanikan (Derrida, Philosopher of Deconstruction)
 Varnabhedangal Padabhedangal
 Mampuram Fasal Pookoya Thangal (Ed. with Dr. K. K. N. Kurup)
 Adhiniveshavum Cheruthunilpum
 Kadammanitta: Kaviyum Jeevithavum (Ed.)
 Swathwa Rashtreeyam (Identity Politics)
 Nava Marxisavum Prachanna Marxisavum (Neo-Marxism and Pseudo Marxism)
 Gramsci: Jail Kurippukal (Gramsci: Prison Notebooks, Ed. with an introduction)
 Pratyayashastram (Ideology, Ed. with an introduction)
 Bhavanayum Bhavukatvavum
 Purogamanathinte Marunna Pariprekshyam (Changing Perspective of Progress)
 E.M.S-um Aadhunika Keralavum (E. M. S. and modern Kerala)
 Indian Sociology
    Souhrudavum Thathva chinthayum, KSIL,
    Nationalism and Multiculturalism (ed) EMS Chair, University of Calicut 
 Books in English
 Creativity and Freedom: A Marxian Perspective
 Philosophy and Culture: Dismantling Hegemony
 Nationalism and Multiculturalism in India

 Articles in English
 "Dalit: A Postmodern Cultural Phenomenon"
 "An Experiment with Marxism"
 "Globalization and Postmodernism"

Awards 
 Abu Dhabi Sakthi Award for Literary Criticism (Thayat Sankaran Award) in 1996
 Kerala Sahitya Akademi Award for Scholarly Literature in 2009 for Swathva Rashtreeyam

In popular culture 

Pokker has been featured in the 2021 documentary Dreaming of Words on the life and work of Njattyela Sreedharan.

References

External links 

 
 Kerala literary awards awash in red ink
 Liberhan report: Indifference is dangerous for the country – Prof KA Siddique Hasan
 
 Dreaming of Words | Official Trailer on YouTube
 Dreaming of Words | Full Documentary on YouTube

Writers from Kozhikode
Malayalam-language writers
1954 births
Living people
Indian political writers
Indian literary critics
Recipients of the Abu Dhabi Sakthi Award
Recipients of the Kerala Sahitya Akademi Award